Greenheys may refer to:

 Greenheys, Manchester, an area of south Manchester, England
 Greenheys, Salford, an area of Little Hulton, Greater Manchester, England